The Balls are a mountain range within the Sierra Nevada, in Madera County, California.  They are  "glacier-carved granite domes" and have been described as "looking like smooth scoops of butterscotch ice cream". The mountain range has federal protection as part of the Sierra National Forest.

References 

Mountain ranges of Madera County, California
Sierra National Forest
Mountain ranges of the Sierra Nevada (United States)
Mountain ranges of Northern California